Hogan McLaughlin (born February 25, 1989) is an American fashion designer, artist, dancer, and musician.  He garnered acclaim after meeting and collaborating with heiress Daphne Guinness, who became a champion and muse for his collections. McLaughlin has also produced a number of pieces for Lady Gaga's "Born This Way Ball", sparking interest and recognition within the fashion community.  He has since been profiled by The New York Times, Women's Wear Daily, and Vogue, among others.

Early life and education
McLaughlin was raised in River Forest, Illinois, a suburb outside Chicago, to Linda and Brian McLaughlin.  McLaughlin has two younger sisters.  He began dance classes at age two and continued to study ballet throughout his childhood.  He attended Oak Park and River Forest High School before leaving at age 16 to join the second company of contemporary dance innovator Hubbard Street Dance Chicago.

Career
After leaving high school, McLaughlin danced with Hubbard Street 2 for two years before being promoted to an apprentice position with the main company.  There, he danced acclaimed works by choreographers such as Ohad Naharin, Johan Inger, and Nacho Duato, touring internationally.

In 2009, McLaughlin left Hubbard Street Dance Chicago to move to New York City to pursue a career in visual art, a passion of his since childhood.  While there, he came in contact with heiress and fashion icon Daphne Guinness via Twitter.  They exchanged messages before meeting in person, launching a major commission for McLaughlin within 24 hours.  His work resulted in a feature in The New York Times, the windows of Barneys New York, and as a part of Guinness' exhibition at F.I.T.

McLaughlin released his first full collection in September 2011.  Guinness wore one of the pieces to the October 2011 opening of her F.I.T. exhibit. Since then, pieces have also been worn by avant-fashion icon Michelle Harper, Class Actress's Elizabeth Harper, and Lady Gaga, who took an immediate interest in his work.  Gaga later commissioned McLaughlin to create a number of pieces for the promotional images for her "Born This Way Ball".

Notes

References
Magnaghi, Brooke (2011). "Lady Gaga Dons Hogan McLaughin for Terry Richardson, Women's Wear Daily
La Ferla, Ruth (2011). "Daphne Guinness Finds a New Talent, Hogan McLaughlin", The New York Times
Horyn, Cathy (2011). "Now Appearing, Real Daphne", The New York Times
(2011) "Hogan McLaughlin in the Spotlight", WWD
Guinness, Daphne (2011). "Window Into the World of Daphne Guinness and Friends", Vogue
(2011) "Guinness' Twitter Find: Hogan McLaughlin", Style.com
Avins, Jenni (2011). "Daphne Guinness Was Very Nervous at the Opening of her FIT Exhibit", New York Magazine
Weiss, Lisa (2011). "Hogan McLaughlin", Exposed Zippers
Soto, Luis (2011). "Unconventional Designs by Hogan McLaughlin", Metrovelvet
(2011) "Concert for the Grammy Museum: Lady Gaga in Hogan McLaughlin", Gaga Fashionland.
Pfander, Catherine Blair (2011) "Daphne Guinness Finds Favorite in Newcomer Hogan McLaughlin", NBC New York
Chapman, Alex (2011). "Chatting with Calvin Klein, Valentino and More at Daphne Guinness' FIT Museum Opening", Paper Magazine
Hilton, Perez (2011). "Daphne Guinness Will Cut You!"
Ferme, Lori (2011). "IWTB Interview: Hogan McLaughlin", I Want To Be A...
Waroll, Eric (2011). "2 Days With Hogan McLaughlin", Eric Blog

External links

1989 births
Living people
Artists from Chicago
American male dancers
American fashion designers
American male musicians
People from River Forest, Illinois